New Line Television was the television production arm of the film studio of the same name. It was active for about 20 years from 1988 to 2008.

History 
The company was founded in 1988 to produce Freddy's Nightmares, a television series based on the studio's Nightmare on Elm Street film series. Following the series's cancellation in 1990, New Line launched its own television unit a year later.

In 1990, New Line bought a majority stake in Robert Halmi, Inc. Entertainment, a production company specializing in Television films and miniseries. RHI was sold to Hallmark Cards in 1994, shortly after New Line had been acquired by Turner Broadcasting System. New Line once had a television distribution shop, New Line Television Distribution, which was previously affiliated with RHI. On October 21, 1992, New Line and RHI was in negotiations to handle management of RHI catalog product.

On February 15, 1999, producer Trilogy Entertainment Group had inked an exclusive development deal with the studio to produce television projects, mostly for syndication, cable and the networks. On April 28, 2000, it was announced that Matthew Blackheart: Monster Smasher, a program New Line is planning on to debut for syndication would debut instead on the Sci-Fi Channel, eventually making it into a made-for-TV movie.

Turner merged with Time Warner on October 10, 1996. On June 16, 2000, it signed an affiliation production contract with Warner Bros. Television to produce network series for a two-year period. From October 2006, MGM Television began distributing New Line's films and television series.

On February 28, 2008, New Line Cinema was merged with Warner Bros. and hence ceased to exist as a separate entity. In turn, New Line Television was folded into Warner Bros.'s television division.

Warner Bros. Television would later revive the New Line brand in 2016 as a speciality producer for new and upcoming television adaptations based on New Line’s forte.

Television series produced

Television distribution series 

 The Lost World (1999–2002)

Notes

References 

Television production companies of the United States
Defunct mass media companies of the United States
American companies established in 1988
Mass media companies established in 1988
Companies disestablished in 2008
New Line Cinema